Gomen Bay or Baie Gomen is a bay in northwestern New Caledonia. It lies northwest of Chasseloup Bay and southeast of Ohland Bay. The village of Kaala Gomen lies near the bay.

References

Bays of New Caledonia